Tăuţi (meaning "Slovaks") may refer to:

Tăuţi, a village in Meteș Commune, Alba County, Romania
Tăuţi, a village in Floreşti Commune, Cluj County, Romania

See also
Tăuteşti (disambiguation)
Tóth (disambiguation)